Tau Kappa Epsilon chapters and colonies are individual organizations of initiated members of Tau Kappa Epsilon associated with a university or college. After the first, or single-letter Alpha series, chapters are named with a two-letter Greek letter combination in alphabetical order of the Greek alphabet, such as Alpha-Alpha, Beta-Alpha, etc. The Greek letter "Eta" was skipped over as a named series. Naming occurs according to the date of when the chapter's charter was granted. In one exception to this general rule, the group that would have been the Sigma chapter received special permission to be referred to as the Scorpion chapter, honoring the name of a long-standing local affiliate into the Fraternity.

A colony is defined as an unchartered organization of the Fraternity until officially granted a charter by the Grand Council, which is the board of directors of the Fraternity. Once a colony has obtained at least 20 qualified members and has petitioned for a charter, the Grand Council may grant a charter by a two-thirds vote. As of 2022, "colonies" are officially referred to as "emerging chapters" by the Fraternity.

Chapters may have become inactive after being granted a charter, due to membership decline, misconduct, or school closure. In some cases, the Fraternity and alumni volunteers may restore a dormant chapter using the same chapter name. Numerous chapters that were once closed have reorganized and have successfully reestablished themselves in their school and community.

List of chapters
The following is a list of the chapters of Tau Kappa Epsilon in order of their chapter number. Active chapters and colonies are noted in bold while inactive groups are noted in italics.

List of colonies
Below is a list of the colonies of Tau Kappa Epsilon that did not become chapters in order of their colony number.

Notes

References

External links
 TKE Find a Chapter

Tau Kappa Epsilon
chapters